A felony is a type of crime.

Felony may also refer to:

 Felony (album), an album by Emmure
 Felony (band), an American band popular in the 1980s
 Felony (film), a 2013 Australian film
 Felony (1994 film) with Lance Henriksen
 Jayo Felony (born 1969), American rapper

See also
 Feloni, American rapper